Oliver Lake (born September 14, 1942) is an American jazz saxophonist, flutist, composer, poet, and visual artist. He is known mainly for alto saxophone, but he also performs on soprano and flute. During the 1960s, Lake worked with the Black Artists Group in St. Louis. In 1977, he founded the World Saxophone Quartet with David Murray, Julius Hemphill, and Hamiet Bluiett. He worked in the group Trio 3 with Reggie Workman and Andrew Cyrille. He has appeared on more than 80 albums as a bandleader, co-leader, and side musician. He is the father of drummer Gene Lake. Lake has been a resident of Montclair, New Jersey.

Awards and honors
 Guggenheim Fellowship (1993)
 Mellon Jazz Living Legacy Award (2006)
 Doris Duke Performing Artist Award (2014)

Discography

As leader
 Heavy Spirits (Arista/Freedom, 1975)
 Passing Thru (Passin' Thru, 1974)
 Holding Together (Black Saint, 1976)
 Ntu: Point from Which Creation Begins (Arista/Freedom, 1976)
 Buster Bee (Sackville, 1978)
 Life Dance of Is (Arista Novus, 1978)
 Shine! (Arista Novus, 1979)
 Clevont Fitzhubert (Black Saint, 1981)
 Prophet (Black Saint, 1981)
 Jump Up (Gramavision, 1982)
 Plug It (Gramavision, 1983)
 Expandable Language (Black Saint, 1985)
 Gallery (Gramavision, 1986)
 Dancevision (Blue Heron, 1986)
 Impala (Gramavision, 1987)
 Otherside (Gramavision, 1988)
 Again and Again (Gramavision, 1991)
 Boston Duets (Music & Arts, 1992)
 Virtual Reality (Total Escapism)  (Gazell, 1992)
 Zaki (hat ART, 1992)
 Edge-ing (Black Saint, 1994)
 Dedicated to Dolphy (Black Saint, 1996)
 Matador of 1st & 1st (Passin' Thru, 1996)
 Movement, Turns & Switches (Passin' Thru, 1997)
 Kinda' Up (Justin Time, 2000)
 Talkin' Stick (Passin' Thru, 2000)
 Have Yourself a Merry... (Passin' Thru, 2001)
 Cloth (Passin' Thru, 2003)
 Dat Love (Passin' Thru, 2004)
 Live (Passin' Thru, 2005)
 Urban Rumination (Metaphysical, 2005)
 Lake/Tchicai/Osgood/Westergaard (Passin' Thru, 2006)
 Makin' It (Passin' Thru, 2008)
 For a Little Dancin (Intakt, 2010)
 Plan (Passin' Thru, 2010)
 Lakes at the Stone (Passin' Thru, 2011)
 Wheels (Passin' Thru, 2013)
 All Decks (Intakt, 2013)
 What I Heard (Passin' Thru, 2014)
 To Roy (Intakt, 2015)
 Live at the Downtown Music Gallery NYC (2016)
 Right Up On (Passin' Thru, 2017)

With Trio 3
 Live in Willisau (Dizim, 1997)
 Encounter  (Passin' Thru, 2000)
 Open Ideas (Palmetto, 2002)
 Time Being  (Intakt, 2006)
 Wha's Nine: Live at the Sunset (Marge, 2008)
 Berne Concert (Intakt, 2009)
 At This Time (Intakt, 2009)
 Celebrating Mary Lou Williams–Live at Birdland New York (Intakt, 2011)
 Refraction – Breakin' Glass (Intakt, 2013)
 Wiring (Intakt, 2014)
 Visiting Texture (Intakt, 2017)

As sideman
With Björk
 Debut (One Little Indian, 1993)
 Celebrating Wood and Metal (MTV, 1997)
 Surrounded (One Little Indian, 2006)

With World Saxophone Quartet
 Point of No Return (Moers Music, 1977)
 Steppin' with the World Saxophone Quartet (Black Saint, 1979)
 W.S.Q. (Black Saint, 1981)
 Revue (Black Saint, 1982)
 Live in Zurich (Black Saint, 1984)
 Live at Brooklyn Academy of Music (Black Saint, 1986)
 Plays Duke Ellington (Elektra Nonesuch, 1986)
 Dances and Ballads (Elektra Nonesuch, 1987)
 Rhythm and Blues (Elektra Musician, 1989)
 Metamorphosis (Elektra Nonesuch, 1991)
 Moving Right Along (Black Saint, 1994)
 Breath of Life (Elektra Nonesuch, 1994)
 Takin' It 2 the Next Level (Justin Time, 1996)
 Four Now (Justin Time, 1996)
 Selim Sivad: a Tribute to Miles Davis (Justin Time, 1998)
 M'Bizo (Justin Time, 1999)
 Requiem for Julius (Justin Time, 2000)
 25th Anniversary: The New Chapter (Justin Time, 2001)
 Steppenwolf (Justin Time, 2002)
 Experience (Justin Time, 2004)
 Political Blues (Justin Time, 2006)

With others
 Pheeroan Aklaff, Global Mantras (ModernMasters, 1998)
 Karl Berger, Live at the Donaueschingen Music Festival (MPS, 1980)
 Karl Berger, New Moon (Palcoscenico, 1980)
 Borah Bergman, A New Organization (Soul Note, 1999)
 Black Artists Group, In Paris, Aries 1973 (self-issued in 1973; reissued by Aguirre in 2018)
 Samuel Blaser, Early in the Morning (Outnote, 2018)
 Joseph Bowie, Joseph Bowie & Oliver Lake (Sackville, 1976)
 Anthony Braxton, New York, Fall 1974 (Arista, 1975)
 Alex Cline, For People in Sorrow (Cryptogramophone, 2013)
 Jerome Cooper, For the People (hat Hut, 1980)
 Marilyn Crispell, Circles (Victo, 1991)
 Andrew Cyrille, My Friend Louis (DIW, 1992)
 Andrew Cyrille, Ode to the Living Tree (Venus, 1995)
 Ted Daniel, In the Beginning (Altura Music, 1997)
 Ted Daniel, Innerconnection (NoBusiness, 2014)
 Defunkt, Live in Europe (Music Avenue, 2002)
 Dave Douglas, Metamorphosis (Greenleaf Music, 2017)
 Lisle Ellis, Sucker Punch Requiem: Henceforth (2008)
 Laika Fatien, Nebula (Verve, 2011)
 Donal Fox, Gone City (New World, 1997)
 Dennis Gonzalez, Idle Wild (Clean Feed, 2005)
 Ross Hammond, Our Place On the Wheel (Prescott, 2020)
 Craig Harris, Souls Within the Veil (Aquastra Music, 2005)
 Billy Hart, Enchance (Horizon, 1977)
 Julius Hemphill, One Atmosphere (Tzadik, 2003)
 Human Arts Ensemble, Whisper of Dharma (Universal Justice, 1972)
 Michael Gregory Jackson, Clarity (Bija, 1977)
 Michael Gregory Jackson, Karmonic Suite (Improvising Artists 1978)
 Bill Laswell, Bill Laswell & Material (Golden Stars, 2005)
 Abbey Lincoln, Who Used to Dance (Verve/Gitanes, 1997)
 Mark Masters, Farewell Walter Dewey Redman (Capri, 2008)
 Material, One Down (Elektra/Celluloid, 1982)
 Mediaeval Baebes, Undrentide (BMG, 2000)
 Meshell Ndegeocello, The World Has Made Me the Man of My Dreams (Bismillah, 2007)
 Meshell Ndegeocello, The Spirit Music Jamia: Dance of the Infidel (Universal/EmArcy, 2005)
 Tatsuya Nakamura, Song of Pat (Nadja, 1976)
 Lou Reed, Set the Twilight Reeling (Warner Bros., 1995)
 Archie Shepp, Phat Jam in Milano (Dawn of Freedom 2009)
 Solidarity Unit, Inc., Red, Black & Green (Universal Justice Records, 1972; Eremite, 2008)
 Bernadette Speach, Without Borders (Mode, 1988)
 String Trio of New York, Frozen Ropes (Barking Hoop, 2005)
 Sunny Murray, Apple Cores (Philly Jazz, 1978)
 Malachi Thompson, Freebop Now! (Delmark, 1998)
 Malachi Thompson, Talking Horns (Delmark, 2001)
 Trio Transition, Trio Transition with Special Guest Oliver Lake (DIW, 1988)
 James Blood Ulmer, Are You Glad to Be in America? (Rough Trade, 1980)
 James Blood Ulmer, Free Lancing (Columbia, 1981)
 Bennie Wallace, The Art of the Saxophone (Denon, 1987)
 Reggie Workman, Synthesis (Leo, 1986)

References

External links
 Official website
 Oliver Lake collection, 1974-2009 at the Library of Congress
 Portraits of Oliver Lake by Dominik Huber / dominikphoto.com

Avant-garde jazz musicians
1942 births
Living people
American jazz saxophonists
American male saxophonists
American jazz composers
American male jazz composers
Jazz alto saxophonists
People from Marianna, Arkansas
Music of St. Louis
Freedom Records artists
World Saxophone Quartet members
Musicians from New Jersey
People from Montclair, New Jersey
21st-century American saxophonists
Jazz musicians from Arkansas
21st-century American male musicians
Human Arts Ensemble members
Sackville Records artists
Improvising Artists Records artists
Intakt Records artists
Justin Time Records artists